Shayak Dost (born 1 May 2002) is a Pakistani footballer who currently plays for WAPDA in the Pakistan Premier League, and the Pakistani national team.

Club career
In 2020 Dost was a member of Lyallpur FC. He made one appearance for the club in the 2020 PFF National Challenge Cup, taking part in the its 0–1 defeat to Baloch Quetta. In 2021 he played for local club Balochistan Zorawars in the National Under-23 Football Championship. By the next year he had joined WAPDA of the Pakistan Premier League.

International career
Dost represented Pakistan at the youth level in 2020 AFC U-19 Championship qualification. He went on to make four appearances in the campaign.

In August 2022 Dost was called up for a trials with the senior national team. In November the same year, he was included in Pakistan's squad for a friendly against Nepal, Pakistan's first fixture in nearly three-and-a-half years because of the Pakistan Football Federation's suspension by FIFA. He made his senior international debut as a second-half substitute in the eventual 0–1 away defeat.

International career statistics

References

External links
 
 

Living people
2002 births
Pakistani footballers
Pakistan international footballers
Association football forwards